Crystal Palace Football Club Women, formerly known as Crystal Palace Ladies Football Club, is a women's association football club based in south-east London which competes in the FA Women's Championship. The club, known as the "Eagles", is affiliated to Crystal Palace F.C., the men's equivalent. The women's section encompasses the under-9 age group through to senior level, including an academy at The Priory School in Orpington. The club plays their home matches at Hayes Lane, after forming a partnership with Bromley F.C. in 2014.

History
The club was formed in 1992 as Crystal Palace Ladies F.C.. Since 2003, the club has risen up England's football pyramid, winning the South East Combination Women's Football League in 2003–04, and later achieved their first cup success beating Chelsea in the Surrey FA County Cup Final in 2011. Palace reached the FA Women's Premier League in 2013–14. The club won the Division One title in 2015–16 after going the whole season undefeated and also won the Surrey FA County Cup that same season beating AFC Wimbledon in the final.

In 2018, The Guardian newspaper claimed that the Crystal Palace Ladies reserve team players were told "they face not being able to represent the club any longer if they cannot each raise £250 in sponsorship, or put up the money themselves", though the club reported this as "inaccurate." The Crystal Palace F.C. men's star first team player Wilfried Zaha, who had just signed a new contract made "a substantial financial contribution" to help subsidise the club's female section. The club issued a statement: "Everyone knows what Crystal Palace means to Wilf and he wants to give the same opportunities to the next generation of aspiring players at Palace Ladies that he enjoyed when coming up through junior teams." 

In 2019, the women's team was featured in Harry's Heroes: The Full English, a television documentary shown on ITV. They lost 1–0 to a team of male former professional footballers.

On 10 June 2019, the club announced it would play as "Crystal Palace FC" instead of "Crystal Palace Ladies F.C." following the growing trend within the women's game to move away from the term "Ladies".

Players

Current squad

Former players

Club staff

Honours

Leagues 

 FA Women's Premier League Division One Champions (1): 2015–16 
 South East Combination Women's Football League Champions (1): 2003–04

Cups 

 Surrey County Cup Winners (2): 2011, 2016

See also
Crystal Palace Baltimore

References

External links
Official site
Crystal Palace Ladies news
facebook page

 
Association football clubs established in 1992
Ladies
Women's football clubs in England
Women's football clubs in London
1992 establishments in England
FA Women's National League teams